Rajdhani is a village in Gorakhpur, situated 35 km from Gorakhpur railway station, Uttar Pradesh. This village is situated near the bank of River Rapti, which is a tributary to river Ganges.
Most of the people in the village are farmers. There is small Aashram called Sirsiya Baba ka Sthaan, where people of Rajdhani and adjacent villages come to listen Kathas (spiritual stories) and to make prayers.

Bhojpuri Language is mother tongue of people in this village. As entertainment, people here enjoy Bhojpuri folk songs,
Biraha, Nautanki following their old traditions. Durgapuja is very popular festival here and is celebrated with worships 
of Goddess Maa Durga for 9 days.

The village has experienced floods many times. 1998 and 2001 flood due to river Rapti was its worst affecting flood India.

References

Villages in Gorakhpur district